Venterol is the name of 2 communes in France:

 Venterol, in the Alpes-de-Haute-Provence department
 Venterol, in the Drôme department